Coleophora violacea is a moth of the family Coleophoridae. It is found from Fennoscandia to the Pyrenees, Italy and Hungary and from Great Britain to Russia.

Description
Adults are on wing from late May to June in western Europe.

The larvae feed on Agrimonia, Alnus, Betula, Carpinus betulus, Castanea sativa, Cornus, Corylus avellana, Crataegus, Cydonia oblonga, Filipendula ulmaria, Fragaria vesca, Humulus lupulus, Lonicera, Lythrum, Malus sylvestris, Mespilus germanica, Potentilla, Prunus spinosa, Pyrus communis, Rhamnus catharticus, Ribes, Rosa, Rubus, Sanguisorba, Sorbus, Staphylea pinnata, Symphoricarpos albus, Tilia, Ulmus and Viburnum species. They create a brownish lobe case that lies almost flat on the leaf, either at the upper or at the lower side. The case is widest in the middle. The mouth angle is 0°. The fleck mines are rather large. The flaps of tissue that serve to enlarge the case are cut out of the upper epidermis. The removal of these tissue flaps creates holes that are much larger than those that serve as entrance to the mine. Full-grown larvae can be found in October.

References

External links
 

violacea
Moths described in 1783
Moths of Europe
Taxa named by Hans Strøm